Grand Beach is a designated place in the Canadian province of Newfoundland and Labrador. It is on the Burin Peninsula of the island of Newfoundland.

Geography 
Grand Beach is in Newfoundland within Subdivision H of Division No. 2.

Demographics 

See also 
List of communities in Newfoundland and Labrador
List of designated places in Newfoundland and Labrador

References 

Populated coastal places in Canada
Designated places in Newfoundland and Labrador